FK Radnički Obrenovac is a football club based in Obrenovac, Belgrade, Serbia. They compete in the Serbian League Belgrade, the third tier of the national league system.

History
The club was founded as Radnički in 1927 on the initiative of the Communist Party of Yugoslavia (KPJ). They were soon forced to change their name to Karađorđe. During the 1930s and 1940s, the club would change names several more times, being known as OSK, Trgovački, and Zanatlija.

The club was reactivated under its original name after World War II in 1945. They won the Serbian League in 1950, but lost to Proleter Zrenjanin in the playoffs for the Yugoslav Second League. The club later competed in the Serbian League North, the third tier of Yugoslav football, on two occasions (1962–63 and 1965–66).

After merging with Milicionar, the club won the Second League of FR Yugoslavia (Group North) in 2002, being promoted to the First League of FR Yugoslavia. They secured their league status in their debut season in the top flight, finishing in 12th place. However, the club failed to avoid relegation in the 2003–04 season. They subsequently finished 17th in the 2004–05 Second League of Serbia and Montenegro (Group Serbia) and were relegated to the Serbian League Belgrade after losing to Sevojno in the playoffs. Over the following decade, the club competed in the third tier of Serbian football, finishing as runners-up four times (2007–08, 2009–10, 2011–12, and 2012–13).

Honours
Second League of FR Yugoslavia (Tier 2)
 2001–02 (Group North)

Seasons

Notable players
This is a list of players who have played at full international level.

  Dušan Kerkez
  Nemanja Supić
  Nikola Vujnović
  Goran Lazarevski
  Chris Megaloudis
  Filip Đuričić
  Marko Jevremović
  Radosav Petrović
  Alen Stevanović
  Veseljko Trivunović
  Nenad Jestrović
  Jovan Markoski

For a list of all FK Radnički Obrenovac players with a Wikipedia article, see :Category:FK Radnički Obrenovac players.

Managerial history

References

External links
 Club page at Srbijasport

 
1927 establishments in Serbia
Association football clubs established in 1927
Football clubs in Belgrade
Football clubs in Serbia
Obrenovac